C26 or C-26 may refer to:
 C26 road (Namibia)
 Caldwell 26, a spiral galaxy
 Caspar C 26, German sport plane
 Douglas C-26 Dolphin, an American military flying boat
 Fairchild C-26 Metroliner, an American military transport
 , C-class submarine of the Royal Navy